The Presbyterian Ladies' College (informally known as PLC), is an independent, day and boarding school predominantly for girls, situated in Peppermint Grove, a western suburb of Perth, Western Australia.

Established in 1915 by the Presbyterian Church of Australia, PLC came under the control of the Uniting Church in Australia in 1977 following church union. The college moved to the current grounds (an  property) in 1917. PLC's grounds consist of a junior school for years Pre-Kindy to Year 6, a middle school for Years 7 to 9, a senior school for Years 10 to 12, sporting grounds, arts centres and boarding facilities. The school currently caters for approximately 1200 students, with boys and girls enrolled from pre-kindergarten to pre-primary and girls only from Year 1 to Year 12. PLC also provides accommodation for up to 150 boarders in Years 7 to 12.

The college has been an IB World School since December 2006, and is authorised to offer the IB Primary Years Programme (PYP) and IB Middle Years Programme and the IB Diploma Programme. PLC is also registered to offer the Western Australian State Curriculum to Years 11 and 12. PLC is affiliated with the Association of Heads of Independent Schools of Australia (AHISA), the Junior School Heads Association of Australia (JSHAA), the Australian Boarding Schools' Association (ABSA), and the Alliance of Girls' Schools Australia (AGSA).

History 

On 19 August 1915 Rev George Nisbet Dods, Moderator of the Presbyterian Church in Western Australia, called together a group of Ministers and Church Elders to discuss the proposal of establishing a Presbyterian college for girls, since the Church had already established the Scotch College, Perth for boys. Present at this meeting were Rev Dods, Rev Alexander Crow, Principal Oxer, Rev Daniel Ross, Peter Corsair Anderson (Principal of Scotch College, Perth), John Maxwell Ferguson, Donald John Carmichael, Inspector of Schools James Klein and Professor Alexander David Ross.

Ormiston College had been established in 1907 by Miss Constance Wilson and her two sisters in Palmerston Street, North Perth. The newly formed committee agreed to purchase Ormiston College, and the School was named Presbyterian Ladies' College and Kindergarten (Ormiston House). Wilson was taken up on her offer to continue acting as principal until a permanent one was appointed. The successful applicant was Miss Agnes Scorgie MA, a certified teacher from Glasgow University. She had also studied modern language at three European universities, and had taught for twelve years at Glasgow High School. Scorgie arrived in Fremantle on 24 February 1916 and took up her duties immediately.

In January 1917 the School's Committee was constituted as the first College Council. After considering several permanent locations for the school, it eventually settled on the purchase of William Gerald Lefroy's property on the corner of View and McNeil Streets, Peppermint Grove. After modifications and additions to the property, all boarders were transferred from North Perth, and the first classes began on the new campus in July. The school was officially opened by the Governor of Western Australia, Sir William Ellison-Macartney, on 11 August 1917. The North Perth campus remained operating as a day school until the end of 1918.

Academic performance
The school has traditionally performed well in the Western Australian Certificate of Education examinations and appear regularly among the top 10 schools in the state.

House system
As with most Australian schools, PLC utilises a house system through which students participate in Inter-House activities and competitions. The House system was introduced in 1934 by Vera Summers OBE, in her first year as principal, with three houses: Carmichael, Stewart and Ferguson. The colours chosen were those of the new uniform; navy, green and white. McNeil was added in 1943 and further expanded in 1977 with the addition of Summers and Baird. Celebrating the centenary of the school in 2015 a seventh House, Ross, was created. The House was named after Professor Alexander David Ross.

Carmichael
Colour: blue. Named for Founder, Past Treasurer and Past Chair of Council Donald John Carmichael. Emblem: Scottish Thistle

Stewart
Colour: green. Named for benefactor and Council member John Stewart. Emblem: Royal Acorn

Ferguson
Colour: red (changed from white in 1957). Named for Founder John Maxwell Ferguson. Emblem: Sunflower

McNeil
Colour: yellow. Named for early local resident, PLC Council member and benefactor Neil McNeil. Emblem: Dryas

Summers
Colour: initially white but changed to purple in 1999. Named for Vera Summers OBE who was on teaching staff from 1920 and Principal from 1934 to 1961. Emblem: White Heather

Baird
Colour: orange. Named for the Baird family from which two past Chairs of Council, one teacher and many students came. Emblem: White Cotton Grass

Ross
Colour: black. Named for Prof Alexander David Ross, who was one of PLC's Founders and served on the School Council for 41 years. Emblem: Chrysanthemum

Co-curriculum
Music

PLC offers music ensembles to both junior and senior students, including a Stage Band, three concert bands, three string orchestras, several string quartets, a combined Chorale with Trinity College, a combined string chamber orchestra with Scotch College as well as a combined symphonic wind ensemble and vocal ensemble with PLC's brother school, Scotch College.

The school also features an all female pipe band, one of only a small number throughout Australia. The Pipe Band is a long-standing tradition of the School and reflects PLC's Scottish heritage.

Visual art

At PLC there is an annual visual art exhibition exhibiting works of current students done during the school year ranging from sculpture to textiles and painting. Works from PLC have been selected over the years and in 2012 to be shown in the annual 'Year 12 Visual Art Perspectives' at the Art Gallery of Western Australia.

Performing arts

PLC also offers performing arts subjects, such as drama and dance. Dance and Drama performances are shown annually at the school, as well as year based curriculum performances. The school's Hazel Day Drama Centre is a professional standard theatre venue.

Sport

The Presbyterian Ladies' College physical education programme provides students of all abilities with opportunities to partake in recreational activities such as yoga and aerobics, and team sports such as netball, basketball, cricket, tennis, hockey, volleyball, soccer, softball, rowing, and water polo.

Inter-school competition is enabled through PLC's membership of the Junior School Heads Association of Australia (JSHAA) for primary students, and the Independent Girls Schools Sports Association (IGSSA) for middle and senior students.

Notable alumnae 
Alumnae of the Presbyterian Ladies' College are known as Old Collegians, and may elect to join the schools alumni association, the PLC Old Collegians' Association (PLC OCA). Some notable Old Collegians include:

Academic
Gillian Moore – Principal of Pymble Ladies' College (1989–2007); Deputy Principal of Methodist Ladies' College, Perth (1983–88)

Entertainment, media and the arts
Claire van der Boom – Actress, best known for her appearance as Stella in the third episode of the HBO mini-series The Pacific and as Rachel Edwards in six episodes of the CBS Productions series Hawaii Five-0
Estelle Blackburn AM – Journalist and author
Katharine Brisbane AM – Theatre critic; publisher; Co-founder of Currency Press Pty Ltd
Jill Alison Crommelin – Journalist for The West Australian, The Australian Women's Weekly, The Straits Times (Singapore) and the Sunday Independent (also attended St Mary's Anglican Girls' School)
Diane Dunbar – Curator of Fine Art at the Queen Victoria Museum and Art Gallery, Launceston
Dame Alexandra Hasluck nee Darker - author and social historian
Melissa Hasluck – Film producer
Jacinta John – Actor, director, producer. Best known for her performance as Miss Casewell in the (2012/13) 60th Diamond Anniversary tour of Agatha Christie's The Mousetrap
 Mary-Ellen Murdoch King – Director of Orchestra Victoria; Director of the Melbourne International Comedy Festival
 Sara Macliver, classical soprano
Judy Nunn AM – Author and actress, best known for her role as Ailsa Stewart in Home and Away
 Paula Voce – Seven News Perth presenter
Sue-Anne Wallace AM – CEO, Fundraising Institute Australia Ltd; Director of Techplas Pty Ltd, founding director Queensland University of Technology Cultural Precinct, former director of Education and Curatorial Programs Museum of Contemporary Art, Sydney
 Amelia Brown – International model
 Tahnee Atkinson – Australia's Next Top Model season 5 winner, graduated 2010
 Courtney Chircop – Finalist in Make Me a Supermodel, graduated 2008 
 Olivia DeJonge – actress, best known for playing Elle in Netflix's popular TV show 'The Society', graduated 2015

Law
Michelle Gordon AC – Justice of the High Court of Australia (also attended St Mary's Anglican Girls' School)
Marie Byles – First female solicitor in New South Wales and conservation lawyer, graduated 1916

Medicine and science
Megan Clark AC – Chief Executive of the Commonwealth Scientific and Industrial Research Organisation (CSIRO), inaugural head of Australian Space Agency, Rio Tinto board director
Margaret Mary Henderson OBE – Consultant Physician and Consultant Emeritus, Royal Melbourne Hospital (also attended Melbourne Girls Grammar)
Joan Tully – Agricultural scientist (CSIRO, University of Melbourne, University of Queensland).

Sport
Hannah Vermeersch – Olympic rower (Australian women's eight, London 2012)
Nina Kennedy – Bronze Medalist Pole-vaulter in Commonwealth Games 2018
Jacqueline Swick - Australian representative rower 2022 World Rowing Championships.

See also 
 List of schools in the Perth metropolitan area
 List of boarding schools
 List of pipe bands

References

Notes

Bibliography

External links 
 Presbyterian Ladies' College Website

Girls' schools in Western Australia
Junior School Heads Association of Australia Member Schools in Western Australia
Presbyterian schools in Australia
Uniting Church schools in Australia
Boarding schools in Western Australia
Private secondary schools in Perth, Western Australia
International Baccalaureate schools in Australia
Educational institutions established in 1915
Private primary schools in Perth, Western Australia
1915 establishments in Australia
Peppermint Grove, Western Australia
Alliance of Girls' Schools Australasia